The Ottawa Central Railway  was a Canadian short-line railroad subsidiary of the Canadian National Railway. The headquarters were at the Walkley Yard, 3141 Albion Road South, Ottawa, Ontario, Canada.

The OCRR was a wholly owned subsidiary of the Quebec Railway Corporation (QCR). It consisted of former CN subdivisions, and operated between Coteau-du-Lac, Quebec, at an interchange with the CN Montreal-Toronto main line, to Ottawa and Pembroke, Ontario.

The OCRR started operations on December 13, 1998, and two years later, QRC acquired the assets of Ontario L'Orignal Railway from RailAmerica.

It also had  of running rights between Ottawa and Coteau on track owned by Via Rail.

Major commodities carried by the OCRR included newsprint, salt, medium-density fibreboard, linerboard, forest products, pulp, gasoline, lumber and board, wire rod, billets and scrap.

CN purchase
On November 3, 2008, Canadian National Railway announced that it was purchasing the OCRR and its sister companies Chemin de fer de la Matapédia et du Golfe (CFMG), Compagnie de gestion de Matane (COGEMA), and the New Brunswick East Coast Railway (NBEC) for $49.8 million (CAD) from the Quebec Railway Corporation.

The CN announcement indicated that the reacquired rail lines will be integrated back into the CN network with no significant changes, other than introducing CN locomotives and rolling stock to train operations.  CN also mentioned investing significant capital upgrades in the rail network for outstanding maintenance.

References

External links 

 Ottawa Central Railway (OCRR)
 Chemins de fer du Québec

Ontario railways
Canadian National Railway subsidiaries
Railway companies established in 1998
Quebec railways
Companies based in Ottawa
Rail transport in Ottawa